The use of incendiary weapons in the Russo-Ukrainian war was first remarked in Sloviansk in June 2014; followed late July 2014 around eastern Ukraine, then in August at Ilovaisk, and between Oleksandrivka and Chumaky in November, all battlegrounds of the war in Donbas (2014–2022).

During the 2022 Russian invasion of Ukraine, Russia was accused using white phosphorus bombs in the battles for Kyiv and Kramatorsk in March 2022, against defenders at the Azovstal steel plant in Mariupol in May 2022, and in Marinka, Ukraine over the 2022 Christmas holiday. The Russian Ministry of Defense claimed that the armed forces of Ukraine used phosphorus ammunition in the defense of the Hostomel airfield at the end of February.

Independent experts interviewed by the media stated that there was a lack of data to unequivocally establish the type of ammunition used, and some suspected the incendiary effect was produced by the 9N510 submunitions fired by the Grad MLRS.

During the 2022 Russian invasion

On 15 March when the incendiaries were used in Battle of Mariupol Serhiy Haidai, the Governor of Luhansk Oblast, called the Russian attackers war criminals, comparing their actions to those of the Nazis. Similar munitions were seen in Popasna two days earlier. On March 25, 2022, in an address to NATO leaders, President of Ukraine Volodymyr Zelensky accused the Russian military of using phosphorus shells against civilians: "This morning, by the way, phosphorus bombs were used. Russian phosphorus bombs. Adults were killed again, children were killed again". At the end of the month, the deputy head of the Kyiv police reported about the shelling of Kramatorsk with incendiary shells with phosphorus. And in the media there were photos showing characteristic flashes over Kyiv. Although at that time the fact of the use of phosphorus shells was not confirmed by independent organizations, experts admitted such a possibility. The active Ukrainian resistance and the poor progress of the offensive  may have prompted the Russian authorities to use "dangerous weapons".

Deputy Defense Minister of Ukraine Anna Malyar said that the government has begun checking on incoming information about the possible use of chemical weapons, to which she includes phosphorus bombs in particular, during the blockade of Mariupol. The head of the administration of the Donetsk region and Ukrainian politician Pavlo Kirilenko confirmed that he had seen reports that an unknown explosive device was dropped by a drone in the vicinity of the Mariupol metallurgical plant, three people felt ill and were hospitalized. Russian-backed DPR forces have denied the use of banned weapons in Mariupol.

In mid-May, Ombudsman for Human Rights in Ukraine Lyudmila Denisova accused Russian forces of attacking the Mariupol metallurgical plant Azovstal with incendiary and phosphorus bombs. This was confirmed by a video with characteristic flashes over the territory of the plant, which was posted on social networks by the commander of the pro-Russian self-proclaimed Donetsk Republic Alexander Khodakovsky. At that time, a number of civilians who had previously taken refuge at the plant were evacuated with the support of the International Committee of the Red Cross and the UN. Nevertheless, about a thousand Ukrainian soldiers remained on the territory, and Russian forces blocked all evacuation routes from Mariupol.

Western experts disagreed whether the shelling of Azovstal was a fact of using phosphorus ammunition or conventional thermite shells based on magnesium alloy. The Russian command did not comment on which weapon was used for the attack. The Russian media suggested that the Azovstal video showed Grad projectiles, and not phosphorus bombs.

Defence View and Forbes explain that they probably used 9M22S incendiary shells developed by NPO Splav during the Soviet era. Instead of a high-explosive fragmentation warhead, the 9M22S rocket carries a warhead containing 180 separate 9N510 incendiary elements. Designed to ignite vegetation, storage facilities, or fuel, these incendiary elements consist of hexagonal prisms made from a magnesium alloy known to the Russian GOST as ML-5, filled with a thermite mixture. Each element has a nominal length of 40 mm and a width of 25 mm and a burning time of at least 2 minutes. It is also noted that the effect of these incendiary, as well as conventional lighting munitions (especially at night), outwardly resembles the use of phosphorus munitions.

On May 16, the Prosecutor General of Ukraine launched an investigation into the possible use of incendiary weapons against the defenders of Azovstal.

In November 2022 some footage was displayed on YouTube that purported to show Grad MLRS incendiary rockets in the Battle of Bakhmut.

On 13 March 2023 footage was reported from the Battle of Vuhledar that showed a hail of thermite fireworks from the point of view of the prey.

See also 
 War crimes in the 2022 Russian invasion of Ukraine
 Use of cluster bombs in the 2022 Russian invasion of Ukraine

References 

2022 in Ukraine
February 2022 events in Ukraine
March 2022 events in Ukraine
May 2022 events in Ukraine
Military equipment of the 2022 Russian invasion of Ukraine
War crimes during the 2022 Russian invasion of Ukraine
Massacres in Ukraine
White phosphorus
Russian war crimes in Ukraine